The Our Lady of Victories Cathedral is a religious building belonging to the Catholic Church and serves as the cathedral of the metropolitan archdiocese of Yaoundé (Archidioecesis Yaundensis or L'archidiocèse métropolitain de Yaoundé) in Cameroon. It is located in the center of the city in the rotunda of the central post office.

It has a stunning architecture, and a large number of seats, with space for around 5,000 worshippers, and an interior cross-shaped. After more than 50 years of existence, the construction of the Cathedral of Our Lady of Victories in Yaounde is not over yet. This is one of the most significant places in the capital, and was consecrated in 1955.

See also
Roman Catholicism in Cameroon

References

Roman Catholic cathedrals in Cameroon
Buildings and structures in Yaoundé
Roman Catholic churches completed in 1955
1955 establishments in the French colonial empire
20th-century Roman Catholic church buildings in Cameroon